The 1975 Macdonald Lassies Championship, the Canadian women's curling championship was held February 23 to 28, 1975 at the Moncton Coliseum in Moncton, New Brunswick.

Quebec and Saskatchewan both finished round robin play tied for first with 7–2 records, necessitating a tiebreaker playoff between the two teams. Team Quebec, who was skipped by Lee Tobin defeated Saskatchewan in the tiebreaker 7–5 to capture the championship, preventing Saskatchewan from winning their seventh straight title.

Teams
The teams are listed as follows:

Round Robin Standings
Final Round Robin standings

Tiebreaker

References

External links
Coverage on CurlingZone

Scotties Tournament of Hearts
Macdonald Lassies
Curling competitions in Moncton
1975 in New Brunswick
February 1975 sports events in Canada
1975 in women's curling